This is a list of lighthouses in Iceland.

Lighthouses

See also 
 Lists of lighthouses and lightvessels

References 

Towers in Iceland
Iceland
Lighthouses
 
Lighthouses